Budhpura is a census town in Bundi district  in the state of Rajasthan, India.

Demographics
 India census, Budhpura had a population of 4387. Males constitute 54% of the population and females 46%. Budhpura has an average literacy rate of 25%, lower than the national average of 59.5%; with male literacy of 35% and female literacy of 13%. 20% of the population is under 6 years of age.

References

Cities and towns in Bundi district